Charity Sariah Lawson (born December 30, 1995) is an American television personality who appeared on season 27 of The Bachelor, and will star in season 20 of The Bachelorette.

Early life and education 

Lawson was born in Columbus, Georgia, to parents David and Vickie Lawson. She has three older siblings. She graduated from Columbus High School in 2014, and then attended Auburn University, where she was a member of the Sigma Kappa sorority. She graduated with a bachelor of science degree in rehabilitation and disability in 2018, and then earned a master of education degree in clinical mental health counseling in 2022.

Career 

Prior to appearing on The Bachelor, Lawson was working at Tri-County Children's Advocacy Center in Dadeville, Alabama.

Reality television

The Bachelor 

In September 2022, Lawson was revealed to be a contestant on season 27 of The Bachelor, starring tech executive Zach Shallcross.  She finished in fourth place, with Shallcross sending her home after meeting her family.

The Bachelorette 

Lawson was announced as The Bachelorette on March 14, 2023, during the Women Tell All special.

Filmography

References

External links

Living people
1995 births
American television personalities
American women television personalities
Bachelor Nation contestants
Auburn University alumni
People from Columbus, Georgia